Anomaloglossus rufulus (common names: Sira poison frog, Chimantá poison frog, tepui poison frog) is a species of frog in the family Aromobatidae. It is endemic to Venezuela where it is known from a few tepuis in the Chimantá Massif in the Bolívar state.

Description
Males measure  and females, based on the only known specimen,  in snout–vent length. The head is slightly longer than it is wide. The tympanum is barely visible in some specimens but distinct in others. Skin is shagreened. The dorsum is chocolate brown and patternless apart from small irregular dark brown spots. The upper lip has four small irregular white spots. The ventrum has dark brown background with white or whitish spots and small dark spots.

Habitat and conservation
The female holotype was collected in a Bonnetia forest, while calling males have been found in crevices and inaccessible walls, usually in muddy soil among patches of vegetation consisting of, e.g., Brocchinia tatei. Tadpoles probably belonging to this species has been found in creeks with acidic water.

The range of this species is within the Canaima National Park.

References

rufulus
Frogs of South America
Amphibians of Venezuela
Endemic fauna of Venezuela
Amphibians described in 1990
Taxa named by Stefan Jan Filip Gorzula
Taxonomy articles created by Polbot
Amphibians of the Tepuis